Orphinus funestus, is a species of skin beetle found in Sri Lanka.

Description
Very similar to sympatric species Orphinus guernei. Total body length is about 2.5 mm. Body Oblong-oval, shiny, and finely and sparsely dotted with black and yellow pubescent. Body dorsally and ventrally dark brown. Head finely punctuate. Palpi brown. Eyes are very large, and clothed with brown setae. Antennae with 11 segments which are yellow.

References 

Dermestidae
Insects of Sri Lanka
Insects described in 1915